Stricteripus is a genus of beetles in the family Carabidae, containing the following species:

 Stricteripus baenningeri (Straneo, 1953)
 Stricteripus impressus (Straneo, 1955)
 Stricteripus peruvianus (Straneo, 1955)

References

Panagaeinae